The following is a table of all songs recorded and/or written by The Stone Roses.

Stone Roses, the
Stone Roses